The Aitkin Carnegie Library is a Carnegie library in Aitkin, Minnesota, United States.  It was designed by architects Claude & Starck and was built in the Classical Revival style.  It was listed on the National Register of Historic Places in 1982.

It is a one-story buff-colored brick building upon an elevated basement and a concrete foundation.  It has a central classical pedimented portico.
 
In 1981 it was deemed "significant both for its role in the intellectual and cultural development of Aitkin and as a well-preserved example of the Minnesota small-town library structures financed by Andrew Carnegie, noted turn-of-the-century steel magnate. Aitkin citizens organized a free public library in 1904. The library collection was temporarily housed in the village council chamber until the present structure's construction in 1911 with a $6,500 grant from the Carnegie Foundation. The library, unlike many Carnegie-funded libraries which have been demolished or altered as community library systems have expanded, retains its original design integrity while continuing to serve the community in its intended educational role. Architecturally, the library is a notable local example of public Neo-classical design."

While it was still serving as a library in 1981, the building later served as the Jaques Art Center.

References

External links
 Jaques Art Center

Library buildings completed in 1911
Aitkin, Minnesota
Carnegie libraries in Minnesota
Neoclassical architecture in Minnesota
Libraries on the National Register of Historic Places in Minnesota
1911 establishments in Minnesota
National Register of Historic Places in Aitkin County, Minnesota